Henry Lester Hooker Jr. (July 17, 1921 – May 13, 1999) was an American college basketball and baseball coach. He was the head men's basketball coach at the College of William & Mary from 1951 to 1952 and at University of Richmond from 1952 to 1963.  He returned to William & Mary in 1963 to serve as athletic director.

In college, Hooker played basketball and baseball at William & Mary.  Hooker was inducted into the Virginia Sports Hall of Fame in 1983 and is also a member of the William & Mary and University of Richmond Athletics Halls of Fame.

Head coaching record

Basketball

References

1921 births
1999 deaths
American men's basketball coaches
Baseball players from Virginia
Basketball coaches from Virginia
Basketball players from Virginia
College men's basketball head coaches in the United States
High school basketball coaches in the United States
People from Stuart, Virginia
Richmond Spiders baseball coaches
Richmond Spiders men's basketball coaches
William & Mary Tribe athletic directors
William & Mary Tribe baseball coaches
William & Mary Tribe baseball players
William & Mary Tribe football coaches
William & Mary Tribe men's basketball coaches
William & Mary Tribe men's basketball players
American men's basketball players